Krishna Shahi is a Congress politician from Bihar and is a former union minister.

References 

Living people
Indian National Congress politicians from Bihar
India MPs 1980–1984
Lok Sabha members from Bihar
India MPs 1984–1989
India MPs 1991–1996
People from Begusarai district
1931 births
People from Muzaffarpur
Women in Bihar politics
20th-century Indian women politicians
20th-century Indian politicians
Samata Party politicians